Jakarta Intercultural School (JIS), formerly Jakarta International School, is a private, embassy-backed international school in Jakarta, Indonesia. It was established in 1951 for expatriate students living in Jakarta and is the largest international primary and secondary school in Indonesia. JIS has more than 2,000 students aged 3 to 18 from over 60 nationalities. The school adheres to an American curriculum while taking pieces from other curriculum models from pre-kindergarten through grade 12. It is accredited by the Western Association of Schools and Colleges and the Council of International Schools. Since JIS is an American Overseas School, it is assisted by the US Department of State's Office of Overseas Schools.  The United States Department of State reports the curriculum offered at Jakarta Intercultural School "has a strong international focus", and considers it one of the best schools overseas for preparing students for American university entrance. JIS has three campuses, two solely for elementary students in Pattimura and Pondok Indah, and one much bigger and considered the main campus for junior high and high school students in Cilandak, South Jakarta.

The school changed its name to Jakarta Intercultural School from Jakarta International School in 2014 to comply with the Indonesian government's regulations on prohibiting the use of the word "international" in school names.

History
Jakarta Intercultural School was established in 1951, as a school for the children of United Nations staff posted in Jakarta, the capital of the then newly Dutch recognized independent Indonesia. Due to an increased international presence in Jakarta, the school moved into newer facilities at its Pattimura campus in 1953. In 1969, the school became the "Joint Embassy School" under the sponsorship of the Australian, British, Yugoslavian, and United States Embassies. Architectural and engineering practice International Design Consultants (IDC) was commissioned to build additional facilities for the school. The new campus was built in Cilandak, a residential area in South Jakarta. The Cilandak campus was completed in 1977 and serves as the middle school and high school. The school adopted the name "Jakarta International School" in 1978 and changed its name to "Jakarta Intercultural School" in 2014.

Facilities

Jakarta Intercultural School has three campuses totaling  and is one of the largest international schools in the world according to H2L2 Architecture. Pattimura Elementary (K-5) is located in the Kebayoran Baru area. Pondok Indah Elementary (K-5) and Cilandak (6–12) are adjacent to each other in Pondok Indah in South Jakarta.

Facilities are mostly air-conditioned and include 184 classrooms, four theaters, three cafeterias, three tennis courts, six gymnasiums, six playing fields, three swimming pools, 18 science laboratories, design technology facilities, and four libraries with a total of 130,000 volumes. The school has a three-level food court, medical clinic, a school bus system run by the Bluebird company and an ambulance.

Administration
Jakarta Intercultural School is an Indonesian foundation (yayasan) overseen by a board of governors and a school council, that functions like a school board or board of education. The School Council is an eleven-member Board of Patrons; nine elected, four of whom are elected by the parents and three appointed by the Founding Embassies. They, in turn, appoint four other members, one of whom must be an Indonesian citizen.

Enrollment

Jakarta Intercultural School is the largest international primary and secondary school in Indonesia, enrolling 2,469 students from 61 nationalities during the 2007–2008 school year.  The five most commonly represented nationalities were the United States, Republic of Korea, Indonesia, India, and Australia.

Secondary education
Jakarta Intercultural School offers tuition for grades 1–12. Students undertake the JIS Diploma, and can choose to complete an International Baccalaureate Diploma, an International Advanced Placement Diploma (APID). Over 97 percent of graduating seniors go on to a university or college.  The JIS diploma focuses on an American style curriculum. For the 2010 graduating class, the universities that JIS students were mostly accepted in included: Boston University, the University of Toronto and the University of British Columbia.

Co-curricular activities

Middle and High school level students at Jakarta Intercultural School compete in intramural and interscholastic sports throughout the year. Jakarta Intercultural School belongs to the Interscholastic Association of Southeast Asian Schools (IASAS) which competes with six international schools in Southeast Asia. IASAS schools alternate hosting each other for tournaments, exchanges, conventions and competitions. Three IASAS seasons per year frame the HS sports and cultural competition calendar.

IASAS Sports: Boys and Girls Varsity and Junior Varsity sports teams follow the IASAS season schedule at JIS each year.
Season One: Cross-country, Volleyball, Soccer
Season Two: Basketball, Rugby/Touch, Swimming, Tennis
Season Three: Track and Field, Badminton, Softball, Golf

Cultural Convention: Held in March, JIS participates in IASAS Cultural Convention, which includes three separate components: "Art and Music", "Dance and Drama", and "Debate and Forensics".

Model United Nations: JIS participates in the non-competitive IASAS Model United Nations, and holds an annual General Assembly.

IASAS Math: JIS participates in the IASAS Math program.

IASAS Chess: JIS has participated from the start of the IASAS Chess Competition.

TEDxJIS Conferences: TEDxJIS suite of conferences are independently organized TED events dedicated to Jakarta Intercultural School's ideas worth spreading, operating under license from TED Conferences LLC. It includes the annual TEDxJIS conference, TEDxYouth@JIS, TEDxJISLive, TEDxJISWomen, and TEDxJISSalon.

Cilandak Games: An annual competition amongst the high school students hosted on campus, where teams correspond to grade level.  Each grade competes in various in-person and online activities such as Jenga Challenge, Escape Room, Among Us, Amazing Race, Banner Painting, Basketball, Jeopardy, Minute-To-Win-It, and Tug of War.

JIS Peduli and Letters from Aceh
Following the 2004 Indian Ocean earthquake and tsunami, JIS started a campaign called JIS Peduli to raise money for schools affected by the disaster. The campaign included Letters from Aceh, a collection of letters and photographs exchanged between the children of the tsunami affected Indonesian province of Aceh, students from JIS, and schools worldwide. The collection has a foreword by Indonesian President Susilo Bambang Yudhoyono and proceeds were donated to a school-rebuilding program. The funds raised by JIS Peduli went towards a new community high school on the campus of Syiah Kuala University in Banda Aceh.

Threats and security

Since its founding, Jakarta Intercultural School has been affected by the political and economic turbulence of Jakarta, receiving both direct and indirect threats to its security. During the 1960s, an attempted coup d'état by, allegedly, the Communist Party of Indonesia forced the evacuation of the school. In 1998, the school year ended early due to riots leading up to President Suharto's resignation, during which time most expatriate families were evacuated from the country.

JIS has also been a potential target for terrorism. Following the 2002 Bali bombings (to which a JIS mathematics teacher, Jamie Wellington, fell victim while on holiday), JIS and other international schools in Jakarta closed for several weeks after warnings of a possible terror attack. JIS was also on the target list of the terrorist group responsible for the 2003 Marriott Hotel bombing, which killed 13 people.

In response to these threats, JIS has made security upgrades. In 2002, the school added a three-meter-high "blast wall," a "boom gate" in front of the school, and protective security film over exterior windows. According to the head of the Australian International School in Jakarta, JIS received $2 million in US government security assistance in 2004. By 2005, the school had installed a security fence, with guards checking cars before they enter the premises.

From May 2005 to June 2008, counterterrorism officials stated their belief that the threat of a terrorist attack in Jakarta had diminished, although authorities continued to stress the need for vigilance.

Criminal allegations
In April 2014 a mother reported that her five-year-old child had been repeatedly raped by the school's ISS cleaning staff when he visited the school toilet. The mother then changed her story to accuse two JIS teachers of the abuse. Jakarta Intercultural School has terminated its contract with the company ever since.

Two teachers were detained in July 2014 having been charged with the rape of three pre-school boys at the school. Despite these allegations, the school, its students, and their parents have voiced their support for the accused. Several cleaners who previously admitted to the charges recanted, claiming that police had used physical violence to make them confess. In April 2015 the two persons received prison sentences of ten years each. In August 2015 the civil suit against the school filed in the South Jakarta District Court was thrown out. Several foreign governments and expatriates in Jakarta believe the teachers' prosecutions were invalid.  Once the civil suit against the school for US$125M was denied by the Jakarta court the two accused teachers were subsequently freed from jail. The prosecuting attorney has also since been arrested on unrelated charges of bribery of court judges in Medan. In February 2016, the Supreme Court overturned the acquittal of the two teachers and reinstated their imprisonment. As of early 2019, the two teachers are still imprisoned. Based on information provided by Canadian and UK news media in July 2019, it would appear that one of the accused has been granted clemency and has returned home to Canada.

The case was considered by some to be flawed with "malicious prosecution" or "investigation with evil purpose" while one of the accused cleaners died in custody with signs of violence.

Notable alumni

References

External links

Official website 

South Jakarta
International schools in Jakarta
International Baccalaureate schools in Indonesia
1951 establishments in Indonesia
Educational institutions established in 1951